The 1978–79 NBA season was the 33rd season of the National Basketball Association. The season ended with the Seattle SuperSonics winning the NBA Championship, beating the Washington Bullets 4 games to 1 in the NBA Finals, a rematch of the previous year's Finals, but with the opposite result.

Notable occurrences
The Buffalo Braves moved from Buffalo, New York to San Diego, California and became the San Diego Clippers, shifting from the Atlantic Division of the Eastern Conference to the Pacific Division of the Western Conference.
The Detroit Pistons changed conferences, moving from the Midwest Division of the Western Conference to the Central Division of the Eastern Conference, where they remain today.
The Washington Bullets shifted from the Central Division to the Atlantic Division.  The franchise also won its last division title until the 2016–17 season.
The NBA adopted a three-official system similar to the one used in college basketball (but not used in the NCAA Division I men's basketball tournament until 1979) on a one-year trial basis. The experiment was scrapped for the 1979–80 season, but returned permanently in 1988–89.
The 1979 NBA All-Star Game was played at the Pontiac Silverdome in Pontiac, Michigan, with the West defeating the East 134–129 in overtime. David Thompson of the Denver Nuggets won the game's MVP award.
This season saw the rookie debuts of Michael Ray Richardson, Maurice Cheeks, Reggie Theus and Michael Cooper.
The Jazz played their final season in New Orleans, Louisiana, before moving to Salt Lake City. It would be 23 years before New Orleans received another NBA franchise.
The Los Angeles Lakers played their final season under the ownership of Jack Kent Cooke.
For the last time until 2018, both conference finals went to a deciding Game 7.
The Philadelphia 76ers and the New Jersey Nets replayed, on March 23, the last 17 minutes and 50 seconds of a November 8 game that had been protested by the Nets because the referee had allowed three technical fouls (and subsequent free throws) to be called on Nets coach Kevin Loughery and player Bernard King.  Before the replay took place, the 76ers and Nets had traded players and Eric Money became the only NBA player to score for both teams in the same game, having 23 points for the Nets in November and 4 for the 76ers in March.
 The Seattle SuperSonics won their first NBA championship in a revenge-win over the Washington Bullets. No team from the NBA's Northwest Division, to which the Sonics relocated in 2004, has won the NBA championship since. This is the longest divisional championship drought in any of the major American sport leagues by 27 years.
 The 1979 NBA Finals would be the last until 1990 not to feature the Los Angeles Lakers or Boston Celtics. Since 1979, the Washington Bullets franchise, who appeared in four NBA finals between 1971 and 1979, have never again made the NBA Finals, or even Conference Finals. The Sonics would challenge for the NBA title again in 1996, but relocated to Oklahoma City in 2008. Therefore, the 1979 title will remain the city of Seattle's only NBA championship unless they receive another franchise.

Final standings

By division

By conference

Notes
z, y – division champions
x – clinched playoff spot

Playoffs
Teams in bold advanced to the next round. The numbers to the left of each team indicate the team's seeding in its conference, and the numbers to the right indicate the number of games the team won in that round. The division champions are marked by an asterisk. Home court advantage does not necessarily belong to the higher-seeded team, but instead the team with the better regular season record; teams enjoying the home advantage are shown in italics.

Statistics leaders

NBA awards
Most Valuable Player: Moses Malone, Houston Rockets
Rookie of the Year: Phil Ford, Kansas City Kings
Coach of the Year: Cotton Fitzsimmons, Kansas City Kings

All-NBA First Team:
G – Paul Westphal, Phoenix Suns
G – George Gervin, San Antonio Spurs
C – Moses Malone, Houston Rockets
F – Marques Johnson, Milwaukee Bucks
F – Elvin Hayes, Washington Bullets

All-NBA Second Team:
F – Walter Davis, Phoenix Suns
F – Bob Dandridge, Washington Bullets
C – Kareem Abdul-Jabbar, Los Angeles Lakers
G – Lloyd Free, San Diego Clippers
G – Phil Ford, Kansas City Kings

All-NBA Rookie Team:
Mychal Thompson, Portland Trail Blazers
Terry Tyler, Detroit Pistons
Ron Brewer, Portland Trail Blazers
Reggie Theus, Chicago Bulls
Phil Ford, Kansas City Kings

NBA All-Defensive First Team:
Bobby Jones, Philadelphia 76ers
Bobby Dandridge, Washington Bullets
Kareem Abdul-Jabbar, Los Angeles Lakers
Dennis Johnson, Seattle SuperSonics
Don Buse, Phoenix Suns

NBA All-Defensive Second Team:
Maurice Lucas, Portland Trail Blazers
M. L. Carr, Detroit Pistons
Moses Malone, Houston Rockets
Lionel Hollins, Portland Trail Blazers
Eddie Johnson, Atlanta Hawks

References